Gotegeria is a village in the district of Paschim Medinipur in state of West Bengal. This village is situated in Kharagpur subdivision under Pingla (community development block) of Paschim Medinipur district in the Indian state of West Bengal..

References 

Villages in Paschim Medinipur district